Communauté d'agglomération La Riviéra du Levant is a communauté d'agglomération, an intercommunal structure in the Guadeloupe overseas department and region of France. Created in 2014, its seat is in Le Gosier. Its area is 207.6 km2. Its population was 63,748 in 2019.

Composition
The communauté d'agglomération consists of the following 4 communes:
La Désirade
Le Gosier
Sainte-Anne
Saint-François

References

Riviera du Levant
Riviera du Levant